This list provides details of cinematic portrayals of composers as characters in film.

A composer may be the main subject of a film, or a less important character.  The events portrayed might be reasonably historically accurate or might be fictionalised to some degree.  The list includes films released in cinemas as well as films made for television.

This list does not cover purely documentary films.  Some films mix elements of drama and documentary, such as Ken Russell's Elgar, and these can be included.

This list does not give details of roles where an actor provides only their voice; nor does it include portrayals of fictional composers.

List of films by composer
Details shown for each film are: 
 title
 year of production
 country of production
 language if other than English
 name of actor portraying the composer (they are sometimes shown at different ages in the same film, requiring different actors).

See also
Beethoven in film
List of films about pianists
List of composers in literature

Composers
 
 
 
Composers